is a Shinto shrine located in Kurume, Fukuoka prefecture, Japan. This shrine is the headquarters for all Suitengū Shrines in Japan.

It is dedicated to four deities:

 Amenominakanushi
 Antoku
 Kenrenmon-in
 Nii No Ama

"Suiten" is the Japanese name of the deity of Hindu origins Varuna, one of a series of Hindu deities whose worship entered Japan together with Buddhism.. When the Japanese Empire enforced the Shinbutsu bunri, the official separation of Shinto shrines and Buddhist temples, shrines celebrating Suiten identified their dedication to Amenominakanushi.

Legends
As a shrine related with water, Suitengū came to be venerated as a guardian shrine for marine traffic and was said to have a connection with the legend of Kappa. These days, it is believed to house the god of safe childbirth.
Beppyo shrines

See also
Suijin
Suitengū (Tokyo)
List of Shinto shrines

External links
Official website 
Suitengū Shrine - Kurume Tourist Information 

Shinto shrines in Fukuoka Prefecture